Karin Periginelli (born 5 February 1970) is an Italian female retired heptathlete, who participated at the 1995 World Championships in Athletics.

Biography
She was 9th at the 1997 IAAF World Indoor Championships, she also won eight times the national championships at senior level. She was holder of the national record of the pentathlon idoor for 12 years.

National records
Pentathlon indoor: 4385 pts   Naples (from 16 February 1997 to 1 February 2009)

Personal best
Heptathlon: 6059 pts,  Bologna, 20 May 1996
Pentathlon indoor: 4385 pts,  Naples, 16 February 1997

Achievements

National titles
Italian Athletics Championships
Heptathlon: 1994, 1999, 2000
Italian Indoor Athletics Championships
Pentathlon: 1994, 1996, 1997, 1998, 2000

See also
Italian all-time top lists - Heptathlon

References

External links
 

1970 births
Italian female pentathletes
Italian heptathletes
World Athletics Championships athletes for Italy
Living people
20th-century Italian women